Olopachys is a genus of mites in the family Pachylaelapidae. There are about 14 described species in Olopachys.

Species
These 14 species belong to the genus Olopachys:

 Olopachys adsharicus Koroleva, 1976
 Olopachys annae Koroleva, 1976
 Olopachys caucasicus Koroleva, 1976
 Olopachys compositus Koroleva, 1976
 Olopachys crassipes Koroleva, 1976
 Olopachys golubevi Reitblat, 1958
 Olopachys gronychi Mašán, 2007
 Olopachys kacheticus Koroleva, 1976
 Olopachys latiscutus Koroleva, 1976
 Olopachys scutatus (Berlese, 1910)
 Olopachys sklari Koroleva, 1976
 Olopachys suecicus Sellnick, 1950
 Olopachys vlastae Mašán, 2007
 Olopachys vysotskajae Koroleva, 1976

References

Pachylaelapidae
Articles created by Qbugbot